Szatmári Magyar Hírlap (Hungarian News from Szatmár) is a Romanian daily newspaper, issued in Hungarian language by the Sam Grup Consulting company and focused mainly on politics, public affairs, sports and economy. The first edition was printed in 2005.

References

External links
 Official website

Newspapers published in Satu Mare
Hungarian-language newspapers
Publications established in 2005